Norroy-lès-Pont-à-Mousson (literally Norroy near Pont-à-Mousson) is a commune in the Meurthe-et-Moselle department in north-eastern France.

See also
Communes of the Meurthe-et-Moselle department
Parc naturel régional de Lorraine

References

Norroylespontamousson